In mathematics, the annihilator of a subset  of a module over a ring is the ideal formed by the elements of the ring that give always zero when multiplied by an element of . 

Over an integral domain, a module that has a nonzero annihilator is a torsion module, and a finitely generated torsion module has a nonzero annihilator.

The above definition applies also in the case noncommutative rings, where the left annihilator of a left module is a left ideal, and the  right-annihilator, of a right module is a right ideal.

Definitions
Let R be a ring, and let M be a left R-module.  Choose a non-empty subset S of M.  The annihilator of S, denoted AnnR(S), is the set of all elements r in R such that, for all s in S, . In set notation,
 implies 

It is the set of all elements of R that "annihilate" S (the elements for which S is a torsion set).  Subsets of right modules may be used as well, after the modification of "" in the definition.

The annihilator of a single element x is usually written AnnR(x) instead of AnnR({x}).  If the ring R can be understood from the context, the subscript R can be omitted.

Since R is a module over itself, S may be taken to be a subset of R itself, and since R is both a right and a left R module, the notation must be modified slightly to indicate the left or right side.

Properties
If S is a subset of a left R module M, then Ann(S) is a left ideal of R.

If S is a submodule of M, then AnnR(S) is even a two-sided ideal: (ac)s = a(cs) = 0, since cs is another element of S.

If S is a subset of M and N is the submodule of M generated by S, then in general AnnR(N) is a subset of AnnR(S), but they are not necessarily equal.  If R is commutative, then the equality holds.

M may be also viewed as a R/AnnR(M)-module using the action .  Incidentally, it is not always possible to make an R module into an R/I module this way, but if the ideal I is a subset of the annihilator of M, then this action is well-defined. Considered as an R/AnnR(M)-module, M is automatically a faithful module.

For commutative rings 
Throughout this section, let  be a commutative ring and  a finitely generated (for short, finite) -module.

Relation to support 
Recall that the support of a module is defined as

Then, when the module is finitely generated, there is the relation
,
where  is the set of prime ideals containing the subset.

Short exact sequences 
Given a short exact sequence of modules,

the support property

together with the relation with the annihilator implies

More specifically, we have the relations

If the sequence splits then the inequality on the left is always an equality. In fact this holds for arbitrary direct sums of modules, as

Quotient modules and annihilators 
Given an ideal  and let  be a finite module, then there is the relation

on the support. Using the relation to support, this gives the relation with the annihilator

Examples

Over the integers 
Over  any finitely generated module is completely classified as the direct sum of its free part with its torsion part from the fundamental theorem of abelian groups. Then, the annihilator of a finite module is non-trivial only if it is entirely torsion. This is because

In fact the annihilator of a torsion module

is isomorphic to the ideal generated by their least common multiple, . This shows the annihilators can be easily be classified over the integers.

Over a commutative ring R 
In fact, there is a similar computation that can be done for any finite module over a commutative ring . Recall that the definition of finiteness of  implies there exists a right-exact sequence, called a presentation, given by

Writing  explicitly as a matrix gives it as

hence  has the direct sum decomposition

If we write each of these ideals as

then the ideal  given by

presents the annihilator.

Over k[x,y] 
Over the commutative ring  for a field , the annihilator of the module

is given by the ideal

Chain conditions on annihilator ideals
The lattice of ideals of the form  where S is a subset of R comprise a complete lattice when partially ordered by inclusion.  It is interesting to study rings for which this lattice (or its right counterpart) satisfy the ascending chain condition or descending chain condition.

It is known that  satisfies the A.C.C. if and only if  satisfies the D.C.C., and symmetrically  satisfies the A.C.C. if and only if  satisfies the D.C.C.  If either lattice has either of these chain conditions, then R has no infinite orthogonal sets of idempotents. 

If R is a ring for which  satisfies the A.C.C. and RR has finite uniform dimension, then R is called a left Goldie ring.

Category-theoretic description for commutative rings
When R is commutative and M is an R-module, we may describe AnnR(M) as the kernel of the action map  determined by the adjunct map of the identity  along the Hom-tensor adjunction.

More generally, given a bilinear map of modules , the annihilator of a subset  is the set of all elements in  that annihilate :

In particular:
 annihilators are submodules
 
 

An important special case is in the presence of a nondegenerate form on a vector space, particularly an inner product: then the annihilator associated to the map  is called the orthogonal complement.

Relations to other properties of rings
Given a module M over a Noetherian commutative ring R, a prime ideal of R that is an annihilator of a nonzero element of M is called an associated prime of M.

Annihilators are used to define left Rickart rings and Baer rings.
The set of (left) zero divisors DS of S can be written as

(Here we allow zero to be a zero divisor.)
In particular DR is the set of (left) zero divisors of R taking S = R and R acting on itself as a left R-module.

When R is commutative and Noetherian, the set  is precisely equal to the union of the associated primes of the R-module R.

See also
 Socle
Support of a module
Faltings' annihilator theorem

Notes

References

 Israel Nathan Herstein (1968) Noncommutative Rings, Carus Mathematical Monographs #15, Mathematical Association of America, page 3.

 Richard S. Pierce. Associative algebras. Graduate texts in mathematics, Vol. 88, Springer-Verlag, 1982, 

Ideals (ring theory)
Module theory
Ring theory